The 1990 Currie Cup Division B (known as the Santam Bank Currie Cup for sponsorship reasons) was the second division of the Currie Cup competition, the 51st season in the since it started in 1889.

Teams

Changes between 1989 and 1990 seasons
 Division B was expanded from six to eight teams.
  were promoted to Division A.

Changes between 1990 and 1991 seasons
 The 1990 season was the last edition of the Currie Cup Division B. Instead, the second tier was changed to a Currie Cup Central Division, which had a four-team Division A and a four-team Division B.
  and  moved to the 1991 Currie Cup Central A.
  were promoted from the 1990 Santam Bank Trophy to the 1991 Currie Cup Central B.
  were relegated from Division B to the 1991 Currie Cup Rural C.

Competition

Regular season and title play-offs
There were eight participating teams in the 1990 Currie Cup Division B. These teams played each other twice over the course of the season, once at home and once away. Teams received two points for a win and one points for a draw. The top two teams qualified for the Division B finals, played at the home venue of the higher-placed team.

Log

Fixtures and results

Round one

Round two

Round three

Round four

Round five

Round six

Round seven

Round eight

Round nine

Round ten

Round eleven

Round twelve

Round thirteen

Round fourteen

Round fifteen

Final

See also
 1990 Currie Cup Division A
 1990 Santam Bank Trophy
 1990 Lion Cup

References

B
1990